In Greek mythology, Perileos (Ancient Greek: Περίλεως) or Perilaus (Περίλᾱος) is a name that may refer to:

Perileos, son of Icarius and Periboea. He accused Orestes of the murder of his cousin Clytemnestra.
Perileos, son of Ancaeus of Samos and Samia, daughter of the river god Maeander. His siblings were Enoudus, Samus, Alitherses and Parthenope (mother of Lycomedes by Apollo).
Perileos, a defender of Troy killed by Neoptolemus.
Perilaus, alleged inventor of the brazen bull.

Notes

References 

 Apollodorus, The Library with an English Translation by Sir James George Frazer, F.B.A., F.R.S. in 2 Volumes, Cambridge, MA, Harvard University Press; London, William Heinemann Ltd. 1921. ISBN 0-674-99135-4. Online version at the Perseus Digital Library. Greek text available from the same website.
 Pausanias, Description of Greece with an English Translation by W.H.S. Jones, Litt.D., and H.A. Ormerod, M.A., in 4 Volumes. Cambridge, MA, Harvard University Press; London, William Heinemann Ltd. 1918. . Online version at the Perseus Digital Library
 Pausanias, Graeciae Descriptio. 3 vols. Leipzig, Teubner. 1903.  Greek text available at the Perseus Digital Library.
 Quintus Smyrnaeus, The Fall of Troy translated by Way. A. S. Loeb Classical Library Volume 19. London: William Heinemann, 1913. Online version at theio.com
 Quintus Smyrnaeus, The Fall of Troy. Arthur S. Way. London: William Heinemann; New York: G.P. Putnam's Sons. 1913. Greek text available at the Perseus Digital Library.

Trojans
Laconian characters in Greek mythology